M&F Worldwide Corp. is a privately held holding company based in New York City. It was incorporated in Delaware on June 1, 1988. Formerly Power Control Technologies, Inc., the company was previously a New York Stock Exchange listed public holding company (MFW) that became part of the Ronald O. Perelman group of companies. It was acquired by private company MacAndrews & Forbes in 2011.

History

Mafco Holdings acquired Abex, Inc., an aircraft control system & hydraulic pump manufacturer, and then merged it into a Mafco subsidiary in 1995 while the aerospace subsidiary, Power Control Technologies Inc., which became publicly traded. Powers Control then acquired in 1996 Flavors Holdings Inc. for $180 million included the licorice business subsidiary, Mafco Worldwide Corp which manufactures more than 70% of the worldwide liquorice flavours.

An Abex, Inc. subsidiary, Pneumo Abex Inc., merged through multiple transactions with Mafco Worldwide. Power Control Technologies was renamed M & F Worldwide in 1997.  In 2000, Perelman proposed that Mafco Holdings' major share in Panavision Inc. be sold to M & F Worldwide at Mafco Holdings' purchase price but was block by an M & F shareholder as the stock was trading at only 23% of that value.

In July 2013, the firm’s main subsidiary, Harland Clarke, agreed to sell Harland Financial Solutions to Davis & Henderson for $1.2 billion.

Subsidiaries

Name (state of Incorporation)
Harland Clarke Holdings Corp. (Delaware) – formerly CA Acquisition Holdings Inc.
Harland Clarke Corp.  (Delaware)
Checks in the Mail, Inc.  (Delaware)
John H. Harland Company of Decatur  (Georgia)
Harland Financial Solutions (Oregon)
HFS Scantron Holdings Corp. (New York)
Scantron Corporation (Delaware)
Data Management I LLC 
Valassis
RetailMeNot
Flavors Holdings Inc. (Delaware)
Mafco Worldwide Corp. (Delaware)
Mafco Shanghai Corp. (Delaware)
Pneumo Abex LLC (Delaware)
Pneumo Abex Lessee Corp. (Delaware)
Merisant Corp.
PCT International Holdings Inc. (Delaware)
EVD Holdings Inc. (Delaware)
Concord Pacific Corp. (Maine)
Centralia Holdings Corp. (Georgia)

Foreign
Name of Subsidiary   (Jurisdiction) 
EVD Holdings S.A.   (France)
Extraits Vegetaux Et Derives, S.A.   (France)
Wei Feng Enterprises Ltd.   (British Virgin Islands)
Xianyang Concord Natural Products Co. Ltd.   (People’s Republic of China)
Zhangjiagang Free Trade Zone MAFCO Liantai Biotech Co., Ltd.   (People’s Republic of China)
Mafco Weihai Green Industry of Science and Technology Co. Ltd. (40% owned)   (People’s Republic of China)
Scantron Canada, Ltd.   (Canada)
Harland Israel Ltd.   (Israel)
Harland Financial Solutions Worldwide Limited   (Ireland)

References

Companies formerly listed on the New York Stock Exchange
Holding companies based in New York City
Conglomerate companies of the United States